Chardinia is a genus of flowering plants in the family Asteraceae.

There is only one known species, Chardinia orientalis, native to the Middle East, Greece, and Central Asia.

References

Monotypic Asteraceae genera
Cynareae
Flora of Greece
Flora of temperate Asia
Taxa named by René Louiche Desfontaines